Till the Wheels Fall Off may refer to:

 Till the Wheels Fall Off (Frost album)
 Till the Wheels Fall Off (Hot Water Music album)
 "Till the Wheels Fall Off", a song by Static Major